The Vampires are an Australian world-roots jazz group formed by saxophonist Jeremy Rose, trumpeter Nick Garbett, drummer Alex Masso and bassist Mike Majkowski in 2005. The band formed in their final year of studying for their Bachelor of Music (jazz performance) at the Sydney Conservatorium of Music. The band has released six albums and toured extensively around Australia, Germany, the UK, Czech Republic, Austria and Italy. The band performs mostly original music by Jeremy Rose and Nick Garbett that draws inspiration from their travels around the world and experiences in life. The band has performed at every major jazz festival in Australia, the Love Supreme Festival (UK), Glasgow Jazz Festival, Edingburgh Jazz Festival, Jazzahead Festival (Bremen, Germany), and the Enjoy Jazz Festival (Mannheim, Germany).

The Vampires have been nominated for an ARIA Music Award, was finalist for Best Australian Jazz Ensemble and Best Produced Album at the Australian Jazz Bell Awards, was a finalist in the AIR Awards, and were the first instrumental act to be short-listed for the Australian Music Prize.

The band is currently living in different parts of the world - bassist Alex Boneham is an established presence in Los Angeles whilst trumpeter Nick Garbett lives in Lampedusa, Italy. Jeremy Rose and Alex Masso live in their hometown, Sydney.

Members
Nick Garbett (trumpet)
Jeremy Rose (alto, tenor and soprano saxophones, clarinet, bass clarinet and piano)
Alex Masso (drums and percussion)
Alex Boneham (double bass, 2008–present)
Mike Majkowski (double bass, 2006-2008)

Collaborators
Chris Abrahams (piano, organ, prophet, super 6, Quantum, Rhodes, 2021-2022, on Night Jar)
Jonathan Zwartz (double bass, 2014-2017, on The Vampires Meet Lionel Loueke)
Shannon Barnett (occasional guest, trombone on South Coasting, Chellowdene and Garfish)
Fabian Hevia (guest, percussion, approx. 2009-2012, on Chellowdene and Garfish)
Ben Hauptmann (guest, guitar, 2014-2017)
Lionel Loueke (guest, guitar, 2016, on The Vampires Meet Lionel Loueke)
Danny Fischer (guest, drums, 2016, on The Vampires Meet Lionel Loueke)
Also one off performances with Matt Smith (guitar), Tobias Backhaus (drums), James Greening (trombone), Mike Rivett (saxophone), Peter Farrar (saxophone), Lloyd Swanton, Max Alduca, Rory Brown, Brett Hirst, Tom Botting, and Zephyr Quartet.

Discography

Albums

Awards and nominations

ARIA Music Awards
The ARIA Music Awards is an annual awards ceremony that recognises excellence, innovation, and achievement across all genres of Australian music. 

|-
| 2017
| The Vampires meet Lionel Loueke
| ARIA Award for Best Jazz Album
| 
|-

Australian Music Prize
The Australian Music Prize (the AMP) is an annual award of $30,000 given to an Australian band or solo artist in recognition of the merit of an album released during the year of award. The commenced in 2005.

|-
| 2017
| The Vampires meet Lionel Loueke
| Australian Music Prize
| 
|-

References

External links
The Vampires

Australian jazz ensembles